Kensington and Chelsea London Borough Council is the local authority for the Royal Borough of Kensington and Chelsea in Greater London, England. It is a London borough council, one of 32 in the United Kingdom capital of London. Kensington and Chelsea is divided into 18 wards, each electing either two or three councillors. The council was created by the London Government Act 1963 and replaced two local authorities: Kensington Metropolitan Borough Council and Chelsea Metropolitan Borough Council.

History
There have previously been a number of local authorities responsible for the Kensington and Chelsea area. The current local authority was first elected in 1964, a year before formally coming into its powers and prior to the creation of the London Borough of Kensington and Chelsea on 1 April 1965. Kensington and Chelsea London Borough Council replaced Kensington Metropolitan Borough Council and Chelsea Metropolitan Borough Council. Both were created in 1900 and replaced the Vestry of the Parish of Kensington and the Vestry of the Parish of Chelsea.

It was envisaged that through the London Government Act 1963, Kensington and Chelsea as a London local authority would share power with the Greater London Council. The split of powers and functions meant that the Greater London Council was responsible for "wide area" services such as fire, ambulance, flood prevention, and refuse disposal; with the local authorities responsible for "personal" services such as social care, libraries, cemeteries and refuse collection. This arrangement lasted until 1986 when Kensington and Chelsea London Borough Council gained responsibility for some services that had been provided by the Greater London Council, such as waste disposal. Kensington and Chelsea became an education authority in 1990. Since 2000 the Greater London Authority has taken some responsibility for highways and planning control from the council, but within the English local government system the council remains a "most purpose" authority in terms of the available range of powers and functions.

Powers and functions
The local authority derives its powers and functions from the London Government Act 1963 and subsequent legislation, and has the powers and functions of a London borough council. It sets council tax and as a billing authority also collects business rates and precepts for Greater London Authority functions. It sets planning policies which complement Greater London Authority and national policies, and decides on almost all planning applications accordingly.  It is a local education authority  and is also responsible for council housing, social services, libraries, waste collection and disposal, traffic, and most roads and environmental health.

Summary results of elections

The council has been controlled by the Conservative Party since it was first elected in 1964.

After new boundaries were set by the Boundary Commission, the Conservatives lost the Earl's Court Ward by-election in September 2010 to the Liberal Democrats and narrowly won the Cremorne Ward by-election by only 19 votes. Many commentators blamed the Conservative councillors led by Merrick Cockell for these poor results, stating that the council did not adequately take into account residents' views on projects such as the proposed Thames Tideway Tunnel and the Earl's Court building works.

As of May 2018, the council composition is: Conservative 36 (-1), Labour 13 (+2) and Lib Dem 1 (-1).

Demolition of the Old Town Hall
In 1982 the leader of the council, Nicholas Freeman, provoked a storm of opposition amongst people of all political persuasions by using his powers as council leader, without consulting colleagues, to order the overnight destruction of Kensington's fine century-old Old Town Hall on Kensington High Street. The building was due to be given special Listed Status on the Monday, but at 3 a.m. on the day before the façade was smashed to pieces by demolition experts. The Royal Fine Art Commission condemned the action as "official vandalism... decided upon covertly, implemented without warning and timed deliberately to thwart known opposition". The Kensington Society predicted that the council would be "completely condemned" for their actions and a journalist writing in The Times recorded the council as being "deeply shamed for the example it had set to other listed-building owners".

Grenfell Tower fire

On 14 June 2017 a major fire destroyed the council-owned, 24-storey Grenfell Tower, providing public housing in the mainly working-class area of North Kensington, causing 72 deaths. The tower block was managed on behalf of (but independently of) the council by Kensington and Chelsea Tenant Management Organisation (KCTMO), the largest tenant management organisation (TMO) in England, which is responsible for the management of nearly 10,000 properties in the borough.

On 15 June, Kensington and Chelsea invoked the help of the other London boroughs in supporting the survivors. Responsibility was handed over to a Grenfell fire-response team led by a group of chief executives from councils across London. Resources available to them included central government, the British Red Cross, the Metropolitan Police, the London Fire Brigade and local government across London. Neighbouring councils sent in staff to improve the rehousing response.

On 21 June, the council chief executive Nicholas Holgate resigned amid criticism over the borough's response to the fire. The Prime Minister Theresa May commented that the council "couldn't cope" in the response to the fire, and that it "was right" that the chief executive had resigned. The Conservative leader of the council, Nicholas Paget-Brown resisted calls to resign, but he announced on 30 June that he would step down and was replaced as leader by Conservative Elizabeth Campbell on 19 July 2017. Lewisham Council CEO Barry Quirk was seconded to take over from Nicholas Holgate in June and took up the Chief Executive role on a permanent basis in September 2017.

References

Local authorities in London
London borough councils
Politics of the Royal Borough of Kensington and Chelsea
Leader and cabinet executives
Local education authorities in England
Billing authorities in England
Grenfell Tower fire